The Ogun State House of Assembly election was held on April 26, 2011, to elect representatives to the state's House of Assembly. Of the 26 vacant seats, 18 were worn by the ACN, 5 by the PDP, and 3 by the PPN.

Results

Abeokuta South I 
ACN candidate Victor Oludotun Fasanya(Barr) won the election.

|

Abeokuta South II 

ACN Candidate Hon. Allen-Taylor, Olufemi Wilfred won the election

|

Odeda 

ACN Candidate Hon. Elemide, Oludaisi Olusegun won the election

|

Abeokuta North 

ACN Candidate Hon. Ojodu, Olayiwola Jamiu (Pastor) won the election

|

Obafemi Owode

ACN candidate Hon. Anifowose, Elizabeth F. (Mrs.) won the election

|

References 

Ogun State House of Assembly elections
2011 Nigerian House of Assembly elections